Al Rigga or Al Riqqa is a locality in Dubai, United Arab Emirates (UAE).  Located in the heart of eastern Dubai in Deira, Al Rigga is a residential and commercial centre.  Al Rigga is bordered by Rigga Al Buteen, Port Saeed, Al Muraqqabat and Naif and bounded to the south by Dubai Creek.

Al Rigga is bounded in the west by route D 88 (Omar bin Khattab Road) and to the east by route D 78 (Abu Baker Al Siddque Road).  The locality is separated from Al Muraqqabat by Al Rigga Road and from Rigga Al Buteen by route D 89 (Al Maktoum Road).  The Union Square is located in Al Rigga where buses and taxis provide transport within the emirate as well as to other emirates in the country.  The Dubai Clock Tower, which lies at the intersection of Umm Hurair Road and route D 89 is situated in Al Rigga.  Additionally, several local hotel chains such as Metropolitan Palace, Zain International Hotel and Sun & Sands Hotel are located in Al Rigga.

Local roads in Al Rigga follow a grid pattern, continuing in numerical sequence from those of Al Muraqqabat.  Even-numbered streets progress in a northwest–southeast pattern, beginning with 3rd B Street (near Al Tahir Restaurant) and ending with 45th C Street (near Metropolitan Hotel).  Even-numbered streets progress northeast–southwest, beginning with 2nd Street (near Bani Yas Cemetery) and end with 44th A Street (near Rigga Al Buteen Plaza).

Both Al Rigga and Al Muraqqabat play a central role in the Dubai Shopping Festival (DSF) celebrations.  Planet Pepsi, a DSF entertainment park is located in Al Rigga.

History
Al Rigga is home to the country's first mall, Al Ghurair Centre, and the first McDonald's branch. Built in 1981, both continue to thrive to this day and have undergone renovations in recent years to keep up with the times.

Landmarks

Deira Clocktower 

It was built in early 1960s, as a symbol of Dubai and called after the Emirate. The roundabout in Al Rigga had the tower at its core and it was the most famous landmark in the then smaller city. In technical terms it is the oldest ‘monument’ in modern Dubai. By sheer usage it became known as the Deira Clock Tower. The Clock Tower has held its own even as it was dwarfed by the construction around it. It enjoys a certain affection with the public and even as traffic swirls around it from different flyovers and turnoffs, the Tower is still referred as an important landmark.

References 

Communities in Dubai